Elizabeth Richeza of Poland (1 September 1288 – 19 October 1335), was a Polish princess member of the House of Piast and by her two marriages Queen consort of Bohemia and Poland and Duchess consort of Austria and Styria. She was the only child of Przemysł II, Duke of Greater Poland (since 1295 King of Poland) and his second wife Richeza, herself a daughter of ex-King Valdemar of Sweden and Sofia of Denmark.

Life

Early years
Born in Poznań, Ryksa was the only child born from her parents' marriage. She was named after her mother, who died after her birth, although the exact date is unknown (probably between 1289-1292). During her first years of life, she was raised by her paternal aunt Anna in the Cistercian monastery in Owińska, where she was the abbess. It was probably there that Ryksa received the news of her father's failed kidnapping and murder on 8 February 1296 in Rogoźno. The death of the Polish King completely changed the geopolitical situation in this part of Europe, and also clearly influenced the fate of the now orphaned young princess, who was now placed under the care of her stepmother Margaret of Brandenburg, member of the House of Ascania (who took part in the conspiracy to kill Przemysł II). During the marriage ceremony of Przemysł II and Margaret (bef. 13 April 1293), Ryksa was betrothed to Otto of Brandenburg-Salzwedel (Margaret's brother), so her stepmother was also her future sister-in-law. Although Margaret received parts of Greater Poland as her dower, shortly after her husband's death, and for unknown reasons, she returned to Brandenburg, taking Ryksa with her. Otto's unexpected death on 11 March 1299 ended the betrothal and Ryksa returned to Greater Poland.

Engagement and marriage with Wenceslaus II
The death of Otto of Brandenburg complicated again Ryksa's situation, because as the only child of the last male member of the Piast Greater Poland line and the first King in almost two centuries, she was the perfect match for every contender to the Polish crown. For this, when King Wenceslaus II of Bohemia (a widower since 1297) received from the lords of Greater Poland the offer of marriage with the princess, he didn't think too much, and even before his own coronation as King of Poland on 25 July 1300 in Gniezno, Ryksa was sent to Prague.

Because of her youth, Wenceslaus II decided to delay the wedding until Ryksa was fifteen years old. During this time, she was placed under the care of Gryfina of Halych, widow of Leszek II the Black and aunt of the Bohemian King.

The marriage between Ryksa and Wenceslaus II took place on 26 May 1303 in Prague Cathedral. During the ceremony, Ryksa was crowned Queen consort of Bohemia and Poland, and at the request of her husband, she adopted the name Elisabeth, because her name was not used in Bohemia  and seen as strange. The ceremony was performed with the consent of the Archbishops of Mainz and Gniezno and the Bishop of Wrocław, Henryk z Wierzbnej.

Two years later, on 15 June 1305, Queen Elizabeth gave birth to her only child, a daughter named Agnes. Only six days later, on 21 June, King Wenceslaus II died in Prague, probably of tuberculosis. The seventeen-year-old Elizabeth, now Queen Dowager, received several lands as her dowry and 20,000 pieces of fine silver.

Short government of Wenceslaus III and marriage with Rudolph of Habsburg

Elizabeth's stepson Wenceslaus III (also a claimant to the throne of Hungary) succeeded to the thrones of both Bohemia and Poland but was murdered on 4 August 1306 in Olomouc, and with him the Přemyslid dynasty became extinct. The Kujavian branch of the Piast dynasty ascended to the Polish throne.

With the death of her stepson, the position of Elizabeth again changed considerably, because as Queen Dowager, she was involved in the fight for the vacant Bohemian throne. Duke Rudolph III of Austria and Styria, son of King Albert I of Germany, finally could take the crown thanks to his father's help. In order to strengthen his position, he arranged his marriage to Elizabeth, both widow and stepmother of the last two Premyslid Kings. The marriage took place in Prague on 16 October 1306; however, Elizabeth's second time as Queen consort was short-lived: King Rudolph died on 4 July 1307 of dysentery after becoming ill during the siege of the fortress of a nobleman in revolt. In his will, Rudolph acknowledged Elizabeth's dowry towns and left her an additional 20,000 pieces of fine silver.

Rule over Hradec Králové

After her second husband's death, Elizabeth left Prague and settled in Hradec Králové, one of her dower towns, which became the center of her domains. However, soon after, she was again involved in the civil war for the Bohemian crown, this time between Henry of Carinthia and Frederick I of Austria, Rudolph's brother. In the fight, Elizabeth strongly supported her brother-in-law; for this, she was forced to flee from her lands, which were occupied by Henry. It was only in August 1308 when the Dowager Queen was able to return to Hradec Králové, which she transformed into a center of culture and art.

Relationship with Henry of Lipá and conflicts with John of Luxembourg

In 1310 John of Luxembourg became the new King of Bohemia, thanks to his marriage to Elizabeth, daughter of King Wenceslaus II and his first wife. John's rule faced substantial opposition from Bohemian nobles, who decided to support Elizabeth Richeza. One of the main reasons for Elizabeth Richeza's opposition was her wounded pride, for now she was degraded in status because of the new Queen consort, her own stepdaughter. The second important leader of the anti-Luxembourg faction was the powerful nobleman Jindřich of Lipá (Henry of Lipá), who was the Moravian Hetman and Governor of the Bohemian Kingdom in the absence of the King.

Soon a romantic relationship developed between Elizabeth Richeza and Henry of Lipá, which, for political reasons, never led to marriage. (This was not only due to the difference in their status, but also because a marriage with the Dowager Queen would give Henry of Lipá claims to the throne.) In order to weaken the position of the powerful nobility, in 1315, King John deprived Henry of all his offices and imprisoned him. However, the position and popularity of the Dowager Queen was so strong in Bohemia that John, fearing a civil war, released him in April 1316.

Alliance with Henry I of Jawor, peace with King John of Bohemia and sale of Hradec Králové

Despite her conciliatory gestures toward King John, Elizabeth Richeza continued to dictate her own independent policies, as was evidenced in 1317, when she arranged the betrothal of her only daughter, Agnes, to the Piast Silesian Duke Henry I of Jawor, who in order to secure his future mother-in-law's patrimony and with her consent, entered Hradec Králové with his army and began expeditions in support of rebels against King John. However, one year later, and thanks to the mediation of Emperor Louis IV (Henry I's brother-in-law) a peace treaty was signed in Domažlice, which restored Henry of Lipá in King John's favor and regained for him all of his previous offices. In addition, the Dowager Queen sold her dowry towns to King John and settled with her lover in Brno. Afterward, the relations between the Bohemia King John and Elizabeth Richeza were peaceful, to the point that a certain weakness could be interpreted by King John's actions, made evident in his approval of grants to the Cistercian convent in Moravia in response to the request of the Dowager Queen. The formal marriage between Agnes and Henry I of Jawor took place in 1319; after a miscarriage some time later, the couple remained childless.

Death of Henry of Lipá, becoming a nun and last years

Henry of Lipá died in Brno on 26 August 1329. After his loss, Elizabeth Richeza took the veil in the local convent, which she had generously endowed, and turned her attention to culture and religion, building churches and Cistercian convents, and financing the crafting of illuminated hymn books. Four years later, and together with her daughter Agnes, she went on a long pilgrimage to the shrines of the Rhine, returning a few months later.

Elizabeth Richeza, Dowager Queen of Poland and Bohemia (known in Bohemian literature as a "beautiful Polish girl"), died on 19 October 1335 in the local Cistercian monastery at Brno and, according to her wishes, was buried under the floor of her cloister church - Basilica of the Assumption of Our Lady, Brno, next to her beloved Henry of Lipá. In her will she made several donations to ecclesiastical institutions in both Bohemia and Poland (especially in Poznań, her birthplace).

Ancestors

References 

|-

1286 births
1335 deaths
13th-century Polish people
14th-century Polish people
13th-century Polish women
14th-century Polish women
14th-century Bohemian women
14th-century Bohemian people
14th-century Austrian women
14th-century House of Habsburg
14th-century women rulers
Polish queens consort
Polish princesses
Piast dynasty
Bohemian queens consort
Austrian royal consorts
Remarried royal consorts
Czech people of Polish descent
Austrian people of Polish descent
Polish people of Swedish descent
Czech people of Swedish descent
Austrian people of Swedish descent
People from Poznań
Daughters of kings